The Mufu Mountains are a range of mountains located on the border of Jiangxi and Hubei provinces in China.

Some maps label the range as 幕埠山, which would be transliterated as Mùbù Shān (Mubu Mountains), but this apparently is a typo.

Description
The Mufu range is a subrange of the Luoxiao Mountains. It stretches for about 200 km in a roughly southwest–northeast direction between close to Pingjiang in Hunan to the Yangtze valley near Jiujiang.

References

Mountain ranges of Hubei
Mountain ranges of Jiangxi